A list of films produced in Pakistan in 1988 (see 1988 in film) and in the Urdu language:

1988

See also
1988 in Pakistan

External links
 Search Pakistani film - IMDB.com

1988
Pakistani
Films